Charles Thomas Alfred Lee (11 August 1896 – 15 June 1979) was an Australian rules footballer who played with Collingwood in the Victorian Football League (VFL).

In his second season Lee won a premiership when Collingwood defeated Fitzroy in the Grand Final of 1917.

After playing in Collingwood's loss to Richmond in the 1919 Preliminary Final, Lee did not return the following week to play in Collingwood's winning 1919 Grand Final team.

This was to be Lee's final VFL game until he returned to Collingwood four years later, in 1923. During that season, Lee played a further eight more games to finish his career with 47 games and 13 goals.

References

External links

1896 births
Australian rules footballers from Melbourne
Collingwood Football Club players
Collingwood Football Club Premiership players
1979 deaths
One-time VFL/AFL Premiership players
People from Carlton, Victoria